Holy Sepulchre Cemetery is a Roman Catholic cemetery located on the northwest corner of New York State Route 112 and Granny Road in Coram, New York. The cemetery was founded in 1942, and is part of the Roman Catholic Diocese of Rockville Centre.

On March 1, 2016, the Diocese created a new corporation, Catholic Cemeteries of the Roman Catholic Diocese of Rockville Centre, Inc. On September 1, 2017, the assets of the former corporation were delivered to the new corporation along with the staff members entering the corporation on January 1, 2018.  In February 2018 the newly formed corporation received its first appointed President Richard Bie.

Notable interments
 Bridget Dowling, sister-in-law of Adolf Hitler
 Ed Gagliardi, guitar bassist
 William Patrick Hitler, nephew of Adolf Hitler
 Edgar A. Sharp, former member of the United States House of Representatives.

See also
 Cemetery of the Holy Rood, another cemetery of the Diocese of Rockville Centre

References

External links
 
 Holy Sepulchre Cemeteryofficial site 
 Catholic Cemeteries of the Roman Catholic Diocese of Rockville Centre Inc Search
    

Roman Catholic cemeteries in New York (state)
Cemeteries in Suffolk County, New York
Brookhaven, New York
Roman Catholic Diocese of Rockville Centre